József Wágner (born 16 January 1961) is a Hungarian judoka. He competed in the men's extra-lightweight event at the 1992 Summer Olympics.

References

External links
 

1961 births
Living people
Hungarian male judoka
Olympic judoka of Hungary
Judoka at the 1992 Summer Olympics
Sportspeople from Veszprém County